Lover Boy is a 1989 short film directed by Geoffrey Wright. It stars Noah Taylor and Gillian Jones.

Plot
In the western suburbs of Melbourne, shy teenage misfit Mick (Noah Taylor) is volunteered by his mother to mow the lawns of her friend Sally (Gillian Jones). Mick and Sally soon become lovers, drawn to each other for different reasons – Mick from typical adolescent sexuality and Sally from desperate loneliness. The relationship leads to conflict and eventually violence.

Cast
 Noah Taylor as Mick
 Gillian Jones as Sally
 Ben Mendelsohn as Gazza
 Alice Garner as Rhonda 
 Daniel Pollock as Duck

Home media
Lover Boy and the David Swann short film Bonza were released as a double feature VHS tape in 1989. Lover Boy was a special feature on the DVD release of Wright's 1994 film Metal Skin.

Novelisation
The novelisation of Lover Boy was written by Jocelyn Harewood and published by Text Publishing in 1994. It explores the conflicting worlds of a teenager and a mature woman as they discover the full force of their sexuality. The joy this brings soon turns to torment and violence.
Harewood follows the film closely. However she also develops the characters, so the reader can empathise with their attitudes and behaviour.
Lover Boy, the book, was published as an e-book in November 2012.

References

External links
 
 Lover Boy at Oz Movies

1989 films
1989 short films
Australian drama short films
1980s English-language films
Films directed by Geoffrey Wright
1980s Australian films